Tom Høgli (born 24 February 1984) is a Norwegian former professional football defender who last played for Eliteserien side Tromsø.

Club career

Bodø/Glimt
Høgli played several seasons for Bodø/Glimt, whom he joined from Skånland og Omegn IF, but was transferred to Tromsø ahead of the 2007 season.

Tromsø
Signed by Tromsø IL as a replacement for Patrice Bernier in central midfield, Høgli impressed in the right-back position.

He was named Tromsø player of the year for the season of 2008 by the supporters and earned the nickname "Super Tom", a nickname he got while playing in Bodø/Glimt.

On 29 May 2011, he scored his first goal for Tromsø in a 4–0 victory against Brann.

Club Brugge
On 18 June 2011, Høgli signed a contract with Belgian Pro League powerhouse Club Brugge.

F.C. Copenhagen
After three seasons with Club Brugge, Høgli agreed on 31 January 2014 to join the Danish club F.C. Copenhagen once his contract expires on 1 July 2014.

He made his debut in the Danish Superliga on 20 July 2014 in a match against Silkeborg IF

International career
Høgli was capped for the Norwegian under-21 national team and was joint top scorer at the 2006 VIVA World Cup for Sápmi.

On 20 August 2008, Høgli made his debut for Norway in a friendly match against Ireland. He was picked by national coach Egil "Drillo" Olsen for the team versus Germany in autumn 2009.

Høgli received the Gold Watch after his 25th cap, in the friendly against England national football team on 26 May 2012, but he had to leave the pitch after 37-minute due to a tackle from Steven Gerrard. According to Norway's medic, Thor Einar Anderssen, this was a tackle that could have ended Høgli's career.

Høgli also competed for the Sápmi football team during the inaugural 2006 Viva World Cup, which they were the champions of.

International goals
Scores and results list Norway's goal tally first:

Career statistics

Honours
Copenhagen
Danish Superliga: 2015–16, 2016–17
Danish Cup: 2014–15, 2015–16, 2016–17

Individual
Kniksen Award Defender of the Year: 2010

References

External links

Club Profile
Happy TIL-Player
Important TIL-Player

1984 births
Living people
Association football defenders
Norwegian footballers
Norway international footballers
Norway under-21 international footballers
Norwegian expatriate footballers
FK Bodø/Glimt players
Tromsø IL players
Club Brugge KV players
F.C. Copenhagen players
Eliteserien players
Norwegian First Division players
Belgian Pro League players
Danish Superliga players
Expatriate footballers in Belgium
Expatriate men's footballers in Denmark
People from Harstad
Sportspeople from Troms og Finnmark